The Dresden Island Lock and Dam is a   Lock and Dam complex on the Illinois River in Morris, Illinois. The dam was completed in 1933 and designed by engineer Walter Mickle Smith. It was listed on the National Register of Historic Places in 2004.  The listing included one contributing building and three contributing structures.

The lock and dam complex includes an arched gravity dam, a spillway, nine Tainter gates, 18 headgates, and a section of fill dirt connecting the headgates to the embankment of the Illinois & Michigan Canal.

The state of Illinois began constructing the dam in 1928. In 1930, the state had completed 35% of the dam but lacked the money to complete it, so the federal government built the remainder of the dam.

The Dresden Island Lock and Dam is documented in a Historic American Engineering Record.

References

Buildings and structures completed in 1933
Buildings and structures in Grundy County, Illinois
Dams on the National Register of Historic Places in Illinois
Locks on the National Register of Historic Places in Illinois
Historic districts on the National Register of Historic Places in Illinois
National Register of Historic Places in Grundy County, Illinois
Transportation buildings and structures in Grundy County, Illinois
1933 establishments in Illinois